= A Vermont Romance =

A Vermont Romance is a 1916 silent film. It was the first feature film shot entirely in the state of Vermont.
